Ek Rishta Saajhedari Ka (A Relationship of Partnership) is an Indian drama television series which aired from 8 August 2016 to 31 March 2017 on Sony TV. Produced by Kavita Barjatya Productions of Kavita K. Barjatya, it starred Kinshuk Vaidya and Shivya Pathania as Aryan Sethia and Saanchi Mittal.

Plot
The show is set in the city of Jaipur in India. The Sethiya family has a son called Aryan and the Mithal family has a daughter called Saanchi. The families are given each other's reference and a meeting is arranged for Aryan and Saanchi. At first they hate each other but eventually get along and slowly fall in love.

Saanchi and Aryan begin seeing each other but their marriage alliance runs into trouble when the Sethiyas, on the verge of bankruptcy, decide to call off the wedding. The Mithals come to their rescue and thus the wedding takes place bringing both families close to each other in the process.

The rest of the series follows how Saanchi and Aryan decide to make their marriage an equal partnership and both try to rescue their families and family members from trouble. In a plot twist, Saanchi is forced to fake her death when much Aryan's family turns against her due to misunderstandings created by Nikita who is obsessed with Aryan. She returns in a new avatar and goes by the name, Malvika Seghal to expose Nikita along with the help of Aryan and Nilima. Nikita is finally exposed after a long time. The series ended on a positive note with all misunderstandings cleared and Saanchi giving birth to her and Aryan's first child.

Cast
 Kinshuk Vaidya as Aryan Sethia; Sarita and Diwakar's son, Nikita’s ex-husband and Saanchi's husband
 Shivya Pathania as Saanchi Aryan Sethia (née Mittal) / Malvika Sehgal, Kusum and Viren's daughter, Aryan's wife
 Sooraj Thapar as Diwakar Sethia; Sarita's husband, Aryan and Sushant's father
 Surbhi Tiwari as Sarita Sethia; Diwakar's wife, Aryan and Sushant's mother
 Nitesh Pandey as Viren Mittal; Kusum's husband, Saanchi and Vaibhav's father
 Pubali Sanyal as Kusum Mittal; Viren's wife, Saanchi and Vaibhav's mother
 Sanjay Gagnani as Vaibhav; Kusum and Viren's son, Saanchi's brother
 Waseem Mushtaq as Sushant Sethia; Sarita and Diwakar's son, Aryan's brother
 Sunayana Fozdar as Priyanka Sethia; Sushant's wife and Aryan’s sister-in-law 
 Sonal Jha as Chandra Mittal; Viren's sister, Saanchi and Vaibhav's aunt
 Simran Natekar as Tanu; Chandra's daughter, Saanchi and Vaibhav's cousin
 Yajuvendra Singh as Prabhat Sethia; Aryan's paternal uncle
 Mamta Verma as Nilima Sethia; Aryan’s aunt and Prabhat’s wife
 Raj Anadkat as Nishant Sethia; Prabhat and Nilima’s son, Aryan's cousin
 Isha Mishra as Neeti Sethia; Prabhat's and Nilima’s daughter, Nishant's sister, Aryan's cousin
 Vinita Joshi Thakkar as Mala Sethia; Sushant’s former lover and Sonu's mother
 Dwij Mehta as Sonu Sethia, Mala and Sushant's illegitimate child and Priyanka’s adoptive son 
 Zalak Desai as Nikita, Aryan's former wife
 Surya Sharma as Rishi, boy who at start likes Saanchi on meeting her in the marriage of a friend
 Mehmood Junior as Mansoor, Diwakar’s childhood friend and driver

References

External links
  
 Ek Rishta Saajhedari Ka on SonyLIV

2016 Indian television series debuts
Hindi-language television shows
Indian drama television series
Television shows set in Jaipur
Sony Entertainment Television original programming
Indian television soap operas
2017 Indian television series endings